Minolops pulcherrima emendata is a subspecies of sea snail, a marine gastropod mollusk in the family Solariellidae.

Description
The height of the shell attains 2.5 mm, its diameter 5 mm. The penultimate whorl contains five prominent keels, all of equal strength.

Distribution
This marine subspecies is endemic to Australia and occurs off New South Wales

References

 Iredale, T. 1924. Results from Roy Bell's molluscan collections. Proceedings of the Linnean Society of New South Wales 49(3): 179-279, pl. 33-36
 Iredale, T. & McMichael, D.F. 1962. A reference list of the marine Mollusca of New South Wales. Memoirs of the Australian Museum 11: 1-109 [33]
 Gabriel, C.J. 1962. Additions to the marine molluscan fauna of south eastern Australia including descriptions of new genus Pillarginella, six new marine species and two subspecies. Memoirs of the National Museum of Victoria, Melbourne 25: 177–210, 1 pl. 
 Wilson, B. 1993. Australian Marine Shells. Prosobranch Gastropods. Kallaroo, Western Australia : Odyssey Publishing Vol. 1 408 pp.

External links
 Charles Gabriel, Additions to the marine molluscan fauna  of South Eastern Australia, including descriptions of the new genus Pillarginella, six new species and two subspecies; Memoirs of the National Museum of Victoria v. 25, 1962

pulcherrima emendata
Gastropods of Australia